This is list of Nigerian Region Military Governors (1966–67). General Johnson Aguiyi-Ironsi took power after a military coup on 16 January 1966, and was deposed in a counter-coup in July 1966 that brought General Yakubu Gowon to power. In May 1967, shortly before the start of the Nigerian Civil War, Gowon restructured the four regions into twelve states.

See also list of military head of state created by Gen. Gowon Yakubu
Nigeria
States of Nigeria
Nigerian region governors and premiers in the First Republic
Governors of Nigerian States under General Yakubu Gowon
List of state governors of Nigeria

References

Nigerian military governors
1960s in Nigeria